The Inverleigh Football Netball Club, nicknamed the Hawks, is an Australian rules football and netball club based in the rural township of Inverleigh, Victoria. From 1970 to 1995, the town was the base for the "Leigh Districts Football Club".

The football squad has competed in the Geelong DFL since its re-formation in 2002.

Inverleigh played in the Leigh District Football Association (1914–1925), Polwarth Football Association (1926), Matheson Trophy (1927–1935), Geelong Sub-District Football League (1936), Elliot Cup (1938–1952) and finally the Geelong & District Football League (1954-1995). 

A merger in 1970 with Stonehaven formed the Leigh Districts Football Club.

The club reformed in 2002, now known as the Inverleigh Football Club. Initially, the club struggled to gain admission to the Geelong & District Football League. The club had to have at least 70 registered footballers, as well as field a netball team (despite the town not having any netball courts). In the 2016 season, Inverleigh finished third of twelve teams. Notable players to represent The Hawks include Michael “The Weapon” Allan. Michael received All Australian honours in 2019.
Ryan Robertson is the only player to feature for both Inverleigh and Geelong Cats in the same season.
He also Captained the Western Bulldogs to the 2016 AFL Premiership.

Premierships

Leigh Districts Football Club

Reference:

Bibliography
 Cat Country: History of Football In The Geelong Region by John Stoward –

References

External links
 Official website

Geelong & District Football League clubs
Sports clubs established in 2002
Australian rules football clubs established in 2002
2002 establishments in Australia
Netball teams in Victoria (Australia)